The Montafonerbahn (Montafon Railway, MBS) is a privately owned railway company that primarily operates services from Bregenz to Schruns, via Bludenz. The company is headquartered in Schruns.

External links 
 
 Official website

Railway lines in Austria
Railway companies of Austria
Transport in Vorarlberg